Making the Corps is a 1997 non-fiction book written by Thomas E. Ricks.

Background

Ricks was granted access to the receiving, forming, training, graduation, recruit evaluation files, and permission to conduct recruit and staff interviews of Platoon 3086 on Parris Island for an article for the Wall Street Journal, which was published in 1995.  Ricks later expanded his research into a book, Making the Corps, which was published by Scribner two years later.

Themes

Aside from providing an insider's view of recruit training, it explores the divergent worldviews of U.S.M.C. values and that of contemporary American society.

Uses for military
Making the Corps is included in the Commandants Professional Reading List as issued by the United States Marine Corps.

Publication history

Making the Corps has remained in print since the time of its release. It was reissued in a 10th-anniversary edition in 2007.

Similar texts
 Da Cruz, Daniel.  Boot.  St. Martin Press, 1987.

External links
Promotional article by Ricks, published by The Atlantic and printed at the time of the book's release
Book review by The New York Times
Book review by Publishers Weekly
Book review by Foreign Affairs
Making the Corps's entry in the Military Law Review (Vol. 159)
C-SPAN book discussion of Making the Corps

1997 non-fiction books
Non-fiction books about the United States Marine Corps
Military education and training in the United States
Charles Scribner's Sons books